Simandoa is a genus of cockroach that is presumably extinct in the wild, as its only currently identified species is Simandoa conserfariam.

References

Cockroach genera